Binyamin Kamenetsky (July 17, 1923-April 28, 2017) taught in the 1940s at Yeshiva Toras Chaim (East New York). In 1956 he opened Yeshiva Toras Chaim of the South Shore, "the first yeshiva on Long Island." "Seven years later, the two Jewish schools merged and moved to a new campus on William Street in Hewlett."

Torah Academy for Girls (TAG), located in Long Island, was one of the "other Five Towns institutions" he founded.

Early life
Kamenetsky was born in a Lithuanian community where his father served as rabbi. Although his education began locally, in the United States he attended Yeshivas Chofetz Chaim and Yeshivas Ner Yisroel. His first teaching job was at Yeshiva Toras Chaim. "For several years, he served as the Rav of a minyan that would become the Young Israel of Woodmere, one of the largest Young Israel shuls in the country.

Family
His parents were Yaakov Kamenetsky and "the former Chana Uhrman" and he was one of their four sons; Binyamin had two sisters. He and his wife, who pre-deceased him, had 3 daughters, 2 sons, "as well as grandchildren, great-grandchildren and great-great-grandchildren."

References

Further reading
Sefer Ḥelḳat Binyamin (Hebrew). New York : The Rabbi Binyamin Kamenetzky Torah Legacy Foundation, 2021.  2 volumes of sermons publish posthumously, and includes a biography at the end of Volume 2.

1923 births
2017 deaths
American Haredi rabbis
20th-century American rabbis
21st-century American rabbis